Wildfires in the U.S. state of Oregon in 2018 include the Boxcar Fire, Graham Fire, and Jack Knife Fire.

In July, one person was killed by the Substation Fire, which also destroyed the Charles E. Nelson House.

Wildfires 
 
The following is a list of fires that burned more than 1,000 acres, or produced significant structural damage or loss of life.

References